Archduke Leopold Salvator, Prince of Tuscany (Leopold Salvator Maria Joseph Ferdinand Franz von Assisi Karl Anton von Padua Johann Baptist Januarius Aloys Gonzaga Rainer Wenzel Galius von Österreich-Toskana) (15 October 1863 – 4 September 1931), was the son of Archduke Karl Salvator of Austria and Princess Maria Immaculata of Bourbon-Two Sicilies.

Biography
Leopold was born in Stará Boleslav, Bohemia. He was a member of the House of Habsburg-Lorraine, and held the title Archduke of Austria.
He was a Knight in the Order of the Golden Fleece and was awarded Order of the White Eagle.

Marriage and issue
On October 24, 1889 Leopold Salvator married Infanta Blanca of Spain (1868-1949), eldest daughter of Carlos, Duke of Madrid. 
They had 10 children: 
Archduchess Dolores of Austria (5 May 1891 – 10 April 1974)
Archduchess Immaculata of Austria (9 September 1892 – 3 September 1971); married in 1932 Nobile Igino Neri-Serneri.
Archduchess Margaretha of Austria (8 May 1894 – 21 January 1986); married in 1937 Francesco Maria Taliani de Marchio.
Archduke Rainer of Austria (21 November 1895 – 25 May 1930)
Archduke Leopold of Austria (30 January 1897 – 14 March 1958); married morganatically in 1919 Dagmar Baroness Nicolics-Podrinska; they were married until 1931. He married secondly in 1932 (also morganatically) Alicia Gibson Coburn.
Archduchess Maria Antonia of Austria (13 July 1899 – 22 October 1977); married in 1924 Don Ramón de Orlandis y Villalonga (died 1936); married secondly in 1942 Luis Perez Sucre.
Archduke Anton of Austria (20 March 1901 – 22 October 1987); was married from 1931 to 1954 to Princess Ileana of Romania.
Archduchess Assunta of Austria (10 August 1902 – 24 January 1993); was married from 1939 to 1950 to Joseph Hopfinger.
Archduke Franz Josef of Austria (4 February 1905 – 9 May 1975); married morganatically in 1937 Maria Aloisa Baumer; the marriage ended the following year in 1938. He married secondly in 1962 (also morganatically) Maria Elena Seunig.
Archduke Karl Pius of Austria (4 December 1909 – 24 December 1953); was married from 1938 to 1950 to Christa Satzger de Bálványos.

Ancestry

References

Further reading
Lost Waltz:  A Story of Exile by Bertita Harding (1944)

1863 births
1931 deaths
House of Habsburg
Austrian princes
Tuscan princes
People from Brandýs nad Labem-Stará Boleslav
Knights of the Golden Fleece of Austria
Grand Crosses of the Order of Saint Stephen of Hungary
Honorary Knights Grand Cross of the Royal Victorian Order
Burials at the Imperial Crypt